Joan Elise Sledge (September 13, 1956 – March 10, 2017) was an American singer best known as a founding member of the family vocal group Sister Sledge. The group was known for their hits during the mid-1970s through the mid-1990s; most notably 1979's "We Are Family" and "He's the Greatest Dancer".

Biography 
Sledge was born the third of five daughters in Philadelphia, Pennsylvania to Edwin Sledge, a tap dancer, and his actress wife, Florez (née Williams). Described as a warm extrovert, Sledge attended Olney High School, graduating in 1974. Sledge majored in communications while in college and began acting in school productions at Temple University. During her sophomore year at Temple, she directed her first stage-play "Wild Flower", written by Hazel Bright and produced by Ron Alexander. Sometime during her career, Sledge briefly lived in Paris, France and studied at Sorbonne University.

In addition to singing, Sledge was also a songwriter and producer; writing and producing the song "Brother, Brother Stop" for a Sister Sledge greatest hits album in 1996. Sledge's production of their album African Eyes which was released in 1997 was nominated for a best-production Grammy.

Personal life and death 
Sledge had one child, a son named Thaddeus Everett Whyte IV from her marriage to Thaddeus E. Whyte III which was from 1992 until 2000. Sledge, at age 60, was found dead by a friend at her home on March 11, 2017, in Phoenix, Arizona. Her death was originally attributed to unknown circumstances as she had no known illnesses, according to close family sources. On March 14, 2017, Sledge's cause of death was ruled "natural causes".

Filmography 

 1975: Soul Train — Herself (4 episodes) (1977, 1982, 1983)
 1975: The Midnight Special — guest singer with Spinners performing their hit song "Then Came You".
 1979: American Bandstand — Herself (3 episodes; 1980, 1981)
 1980: The John Davidson Show  — Herself (1 episode)
 1981: Kids Are People, Too  — Herself (1 episode)
 1982: Fridays — Herself (1 episode)
 1984: The Jeffersons — Joni Satin (Season 10, Episode 16; My Guy, George)
 2000: 100 Greatest Dance Songs of Rock & Roll — Herself
 2006: Archive Footage:Be My Baby: The Girl Group Story — Herself (uncredited)
 2008: Soul Power — Herself (with Sister Sledge) (uncredited; 1974 concert series from "The Rumble in the Jungle" between Muhammad Ali and George Foreman in Zaire)

References 

1956 births
2017 deaths
Musicians from Philadelphia
American disco musicians
20th-century African-American women singers
Burials at Ivy Hill Cemetery (Philadelphia)
20th-century American women singers
20th-century American singers
21st-century African-American people
21st-century African-American women
Sister Sledge members